Valentino Lanús (born May 3, 1975, in Mexico City) is a Mexican actor.

Biography 
Valentino's parents are Margarita and Luis Alberto. Valentino is the second of four siblings, and is also the only male. He began his career as a model, and later enrolled in Televisa's CEA (Centro de Educación Artística). It was then when telenovela producer Carla Estrada invited him to participate in some episodes of María Isabel (1997), alongside Adela Noriega.

He later received roles in Amor Gitano (1999), La casa en la playa (2000) and Pedro Damián's Primer amor... a mil por hora (2000), where he played Imanol Jáuregui Tasso, alongside Ana Layevska, Anahí, Kuno Becker, and Sebastián Rulli. His charisma and acting style placed him among the favorites.

Soon after, Valentino participated in the telenovela El juego de la vida (2001), where embodied Juan Carlos Domínguez, a coach of girls' football. Around that time, he began dating Jacqueline Bracamontes. He also acted in Amar Otra Vez (2003) and Inocente de Ti (2004) as Julio Alberto Castillo Linares, opposite Camila Sodi, and Karla Monroig. He also appeared in Alborada (2005) as Martín Alvarado. He had the lead role in the telenovela Amar sin límites with Karyme Lozano.

He is a professional photographer and passionate traveler, who will exhibit his work of over 15 years in Madrid at the end of 2011.

He is also a producer of various TV shows and movies. His last venture is called "Artesanos", a promising film by creator Santiago Pando, a famous mystic, well known for having been the brain behind the successful political campaign that placed Vicente Fox as the first Mexican President to win over 80 years of the ruling party PRI.

Filmography

Films

Television

References

External links
 Official Website
 

1975 births
Living people
Mexican male telenovela actors
Mexican male models
Male actors from Mexico City